Catahoula Parish School Board is a school district headquartered in Harrisonburg, Louisiana, United States.

The district serves Catahoula Parish.

Schools

K-12 schools
 Central High School * (Unincorporated area)
 Harrisonburg High School
(Harrisonburg)
 Sicily Island High School
(Sicily Island)

8-12 schools
 Block High School 
(Jonesville)

5-7 schools
Jonesville Junior High School
(Jonesville)

External links
 Catahoula Parish School Board

School districts in Louisiana
Education in Catahoula Parish, Louisiana